George R. Morris (1874 – after 1902) was an English footballer who made 103 appearances in the Football League playing for Lincoln City, Glossop and Barnsley. He played as a left half. He also played in the Southern League for Millwall Athletic.

References

1879 births
Year of death missing
Footballers from Manchester
English footballers
Association football wing halves
Lincoln City F.C. players
Glossop North End A.F.C. players
Barnsley F.C. players
Millwall F.C. players
English Football League players
Southern Football League players
Date of birth missing
Place of death missing